Anvil Publishing, Inc., is the publishing arm of National Book Store. It publishes print books, e-books, and audiobooks.

Anvil is a nationwide book dealer to network servicing dealers in the Philippines which includes National Book Store (Anvil's parent company), Goodwill Book Store, Rex Book Store, and Solidaridad.

Anvil is an eleven-time Publisher of the Year awardee, as cited by the Manila Critics Circle.

In 2016, founder Karina Bolasco left the company after 25 years.

In July 2020, General Manager Andrea Pasion-Flores resigned after three years in the company.

In 2018, Anvil Publishing, under the imprint Anvil Audio, published its first audiobook titled Dear Universe: Poems on Love, Longing, and Finding Your Place in the Cosmos by Pierra Calasanz-Labrador and narrated by actress Joyce Pring.

Notable titles
 
 
 
Bautista, Lualhati. Dekada '70.
Joaquin, Nick. The Woman Who Had Two Navels.
Joaquin, Nick. May Day Eve and Other Stories.
Joaquin, Nick. Tropical Baroque: Four Manileño Theatricals.
Bulosan, Carlos. America Is in the Heart.
Bautista, Lualhati. Bata, Bata... Pa'no Ka Ginawa?
Bautista, Lualhati. Desaparesidos.

References

External links
 

Book publishing companies of the Philippines
Publishing companies established in 1990
Companies based in Mandaluyong